The Chinese fire belly newt (Cynops orientalis) is a small black newt, with bright-orange aposematic coloration on their ventral sides.  C. orientalis is commonly seen in pet stores, where it is frequently confused with the Japanese fire belly newt (C. pyrrhogaster) due to similarities in size and coloration.  C. orientalis typically exhibits smoother skin and a rounder tail than C. pyrrhogaster, and has less obvious parotoid glands. C. orientalis is native to subtropical forests in China and prefers to live in shallow, semiaquatic environments such as abandoned paddies and ponds with dense vegetation.

Toxicology 
Chinese fire belly newts are mildly poisonous and excrete toxins through their skin. Consisting primarily of tetrodotoxins, newts of the genus Cynops pose a medically significant threat if enough toxins are consumed, and toxins may cause numbness or irritation on skin contact.

Gallery

See also 
 Daazvirus cynopis

References

Further reading 

 Chang, Mangven L. Y. 1936. Contribution à l'étude Morphologique, Biologique et systématique des Amphibiens urodèles de la Chine. Libraire Picart, Paris, 156 p.

Cynops
Amphibians of China
Endemic fauna of China
Aposematic species
Taxa named by Armand David
Amphibians described in 1873